Henryk Sawistowski (1925-1984) was a Polish-born British academic.

He was born in 1925 in Grudziądz, Poland.

Sawistowski started his education in Grudziądz, during World War II while in military service. After the war he moved to London, England.

In 1974, after earning a diploma he became a lecturer at his school - the Imperial College London gradually rising the ranks to vice-president of Institution of Chemical Engineers in 1981 and dean of City and Guilds college until his death in 1984.

1925 births
1984 deaths
People from Grudziądz
Polish academics
Deans of the City and Guilds College
Polish emigrants to the United Kingdom
Academics of Imperial College London